The Letter for the King is a coming-of-age fantasy adventure television series developed by Will Davies and FilmWave for Netflix inspired by the classic 1962 Dutch novel  by Tonke Dragt. The six-episode series was released on Netflix on 20 March 2020.

Premise
A young aspiring knight Tiuri (Amir Wilson) finds himself on a perilous mission to deliver a secret letter to the King who lives across the Great Mountains.

Cast
 Amir Wilson as Tiuri
 Ruby Ashbourne Serkis as Lavinia
 Thaddea Graham as Iona
 Islam Bouakkaz as Arman
 Jonah Lees as Jussipo
 Jack Barton as Foldo
 Nathanael Saleh as Piak
 Gijs Blom as Prince Viridian
 Emilie Cocquerel as Queen Alianor
 Peter Ferdinando as Jaro

Recurring and supporting
 Kemi-Bo Jacobs as Darya
 David Wenham as Sir Tiuri the Valiant
 Omid Djalili as Sir Fantumar
 Ken Nwosu as Ristridin
 Yorick van Wageningen as King Favian
 Jakob Oftebro as Prince Iridian
 Tawfeek Barhom as Jabroot
 Moshidi Motshegwa

Notable guests
 Jóhannes Haukur Jóhannesson as Bors
 Ben Chaplin as The Black Knight
 Fionn O'Shea as Tristan
 Andy Serkis as Mayor of Mistrinaut
 Kim Bodnia as Abbot
 David Wilmot as Slupor
 Lisa Loven Kongsli as Shona
 Peter McCauley as General

Episodes

Production

Development
In July 2018, it was announced Netflix had ordered an original series based on Tonke Dragt's De brief voor de Koning with Will Davies as showrunner and executive producer. This is the first Netflix adaptation of a Dutch book, although it will be adapted in English; the series is titled after the English translation, which was published in 2014. FilmWave acquired the international rights in a deal with Leopold. Paul Trijbits of FilmWave is executive producing, Chris Clark is producing, and Alex Holmes and Felix Thompson are directing.

Casting
The cast was announced in December 2018 with Amir Wilson in the lead role.

Filming
Principal photography took place in New Zealand and Prague, Czech Republic.

Music
Brandon Campbell composed the music for the series. "It’s an orchestral, adventure score, but we wove in a lot of Western elements. There are acoustic guitars, some vocals, the fiddle, and trumpet. Our approach to this project, and our vision as it came together, was a Western that takes place in the middle of this magical adventure," he told Awards Daily.

Jussipo uses the score of "In Hell, I'll Be in Good Company" from the band "The Dead South" as music for his songs, this music is also sung for his burial.

Release
First-look promotional pictures were released in January 2020 followed by a teaser and trailer in February.

Reception

Critical reception
On Rotten Tomatoes, the series has an approval rating of 60% based on reviews from 20 critics, with an average rating of 6.69/10. The website's critical consensus reads: "The Letter for the King aspires for greatness, but poor pacing stretched across too many episodes hinder what could be an epic journey." On Metacritic, the series has a score of 55 out of 100 based on reviews from 6 critics, indicating "mixed or average reviews".

Anglophone reception
Jack Seale of The Guardian, in awarding the series 3 out of 5 stars, wrote: "But while The Letter for the King doesn’t feel like an adults’ show that kids can get away with watching, it's also not a kids’ show that's fun enough for adults to enjoy, with its bowdlerised fights and romance." David Opie of Digital Spy gave it 2 out of 5 stars and wrote: "Unfortunately, The Letter For The King is not the new fantasy smash we were hoping for, so you can toss out any high expectations you might have like a coin to your Witcher. In fact, it's not even that great for fans of the book either.".

The Letter for the King was frequently dubbed as a Game of Thrones for children. Patrick Cremona of Radio Times gave it 2 out of 5 stars and wrote: "The show is watchable enough, and might serve as a useful way into medieval fantasy for younger audiences who aren’t yet ready for the more adult-orientated series that have recently dominated the genre, which is by no means a bad thing. It seems unlikely, however, that this is the next big fantasy series that Netflix might have hoped for. The hunt for the next Game of Thrones goes on…".

Dutch reception
Although the series topped the Netflix ratings in the Netherlands, it also received very mixed critical reviews, mostly directed towards the execution of the series based on the book by Dragt. Mark Moorman of De Volkskrant awarded the show 3 out of 5 stars and commented: "With nice young actors, beautiful cinematography and a strong quest, The Letter for the King is a reasonable success. But it does feel a bit like Netflix has crushed our favourite children's book with a steam engine." Belinda van de Graaf of Trouw also awarded the series 3 out of 5 stars and wrote: "In their dedication to inclusivity, the creators went even further. Tiuri's most important companion is no longer a boy (Piak) but a girl, Lavinia. And near the end, there is an intimate kiss between two trainees. Sweet, that kiss between two guys, but that scene just appeared out of thin air. The same counts for all the hocus pocus that the creators added. It's understandable why Tonke Dragt prefers talking about literary adaptions of her book, rather than visual adaptions."

Awards and nominations

References

External links

English-language Netflix original programming
British teen drama television series
2020 British television series debuts
2020 British television series endings
Coming-of-age television shows
High fantasy television series
Television series about teenagers
Television shows based on Dutch novels
Television shows filmed in the Czech Republic
Television shows filmed in New Zealand
2020 Dutch television series debuts